Mummolinus (sometimes Mummolenus or Mommolinus) may refer to:

Mummolinus of Soissons, a 6th-century Frankish nobleman
Mummolinus of Noyon, a bishop of Tournai and Noyon (7th century)